Olivia 'Livy' Paige  (born 28 July 1996) is an English international field hockey player who played as a midfielder for England and Great Britain.

She plays club hockey in the Women's England Hockey League Premier Division for Hampstead & Westminster.
 
Paige has also played for hdm, Uni of Birmingham, Reading and Marlow.

References

English female field hockey players
1996 births
Living people
Reading Hockey Club players
Women's England Hockey League players
University of Birmingham Hockey Club players